Dame Sheila Cameron Hancock  (born 22 February 1933) is an English actress, singer, and author. Hancock trained at the Royal Academy of Dramatic Art before starting her career in repertory theatre. Hancock went on to perform in plays and musicals in London, and her Broadway debut in Entertaining Mr Sloane (1966) earned her a Tony Award nomination for Best Lead Actress in Play.

Hancock won a Laurence Olivier Award for Best Performance in a Supporting Role in a Musical for her role in Cabaret (2007) and was nominated at the Laurence Olivier Awards five other times for her work in Annie (1978), Sweeney Todd (1980), The Winter's Tale (1982), Prin (1989) and Sister Act (2010).

Early life
Sheila Cameron Hancock was born in Blackgang on the Isle of Wight, the daughter of Enrico Cameron Hancock and Ivy Louise (née Woodward). Enrico Hancock was the son of a Thomas Cook employee, and grew up in Milan. He worked for Vickers, and was previously a publican and hotel manager for the Brakspear Brewery, working on the Isle of Wight, in Berkshire, and at King's Cross, London. Ivy Hancock worked at Hedley Mitchells, a department store in Erith, setting up a café and theatre booking office there after working in gloves and lingerie, having previously worked alongside her husband in pubs and hotels; before her marriage she had worked at a Lewisham pub and a flower shop at Greenwich.

After leaving the hospitality industry in 1938, the Hancocks moved to a semi-detached house in Latham Road, Bexleyheath, which Hancock considered "dreadfully dull" compared to "the rough and tumble" of King's Cross. Hancock recalled that there was a sense that "we had definitely gone up in the world... became lower-middle-class." Her sister Billie was seven years older. Hancock was educated at St Etheldreda's Convent at Ely Place, Holborn, then at Upton Road Junior School and Upland Junior School. After wartime evacuation to Wallingford, Oxfordshire (at that time, in Berkshire) and to Crewkerne, Somerset, Hancock attended the Dartford County Grammar School and the Royal Academy of Dramatic Art.

Theatre 
Hancock worked in repertory during the 1950s and made her West End debut in 1958, replacing Joan Sims in the play Breath of Spring. She then appeared in Joan Littlewood's Theatre Workshop production of Make Me An Offer in 1959, and her other early West End appearances included Peter Cook's revue One Over the Eight with Kenneth Williams in 1961, and starring in Rattle of a Simple Man in 1962. She recalled that in One over the Eight she had been egged on by Irving Davies's exhortation as dance captain, "Eyes, teeth, and tits, darlings – and sparkle, sparkle, sparkle!"

In 1965, Hancock made her Broadway debut in Entertaining Mr Sloane. In 1978, she played Miss Hannigan in the original London cast of the musical Annie and two years later, she played Mrs Lovett in the original London production of the musical Sweeney Todd at the Theatre Royal, Drury Lane; her portrayal was described as having "caught the love-story element perfectly.

Hancock has appeared in The Winter's Tale, Titus Andronicus and A Delicate Balance for the Royal Shakespeare Company (RSC). At the National Theatre she has appeared in Neil Bartlett's In Extremis/ De Profundis, The Cherry Orchard and The Duchess of Malfi. She was also the first woman director of the RSC touring company, directing A Midsummer Night's Dream and was the first woman to direct in the Olivier Theatre at the National Theatre with The Critic. She was also associate artistic director of the Cambridge Theatre Company.

Hancock took the role of Rose in the West Yorkshire Playhouse’s 1993 production of Gypsy; a reviewer commented that she "certainly had the measure of Rose... 'Everything's coming up roses' brought the first hint of true pathos into the show", while in the final scene "her wild fluctuations between self-belief and self-doubt ended in tear-jerking self-awareness".

In 2006, Hancock played the role of Fräulein Schneider in the West End revival of the musical Cabaret at the Lyric Theatre. She won the Laurence Olivier Award, and the Clarence Derwent Award, for Best Performance in a Supporting Role in a Musical. In 2009, she spent over a year playing Mother Superior in Sister Act the Musical at the London Palladium for which she was nominated for an Olivier Award.

In 2013, Hancock starred alongside Lee Evans and Keeley Hawes in the comedy Barking in Essex at Wyndham's Theatre.

In 2016, Hancock starred with Jenna Russell in the UK premiere of the musical Grey Gardens at Southwark Playhouse. In 2018, she played Maude in Harold and Maude at the Charing Cross Theatre, London. In 2019, Hancock starred in the musical This Is My Family at the Minerva Theatre, Chichester.

Television 
Hancock's first big television role was as Carol in the BBC sitcom The Rag Trade in the early 1960s. She also played the lead roles in the sitcoms The Bed-Sit Girl, Mr Digby Darling  and Now Take My Wife. Her other television credits include Doctor Who (playing a parody of Margaret Thatcher in The Happiness Patrol), Kavanagh QC (opposite her husband, John Thaw), Gone to the Dogs, Brighton Belles, EastEnders, The Russian Bride, Bedtime, Fortysomething, Feather Boy, Bleak House, New Tricks, Hustle and The Catherine Tate Show. In 2008, she played the part of a terminally ill patient who travelled to Switzerland for an assisted suicide in one of The Last Word monologues for the BBC, in a role that was written especially for her by Hugo Blick. In 2009, she played Liz in The Rain Has Stopped, the first episode of the BBC anthology series Moving On.

Hancock has also presented several documentaries. In 2010, she presented Suffragette City (part of A History of the World series), telling the story of the suffragette movement through objects from the Museum of London's collection. In 2011, she presented Sheila Hancock Brushes Up: The Art of Watercolours, exploring the history of watercolour via beautiful yet little-known works of professional and amateur artists. In 2013 she presented, as part of the ITV Perspectives documentary series, Perspectives: Sheila Hancock – The Brilliant Brontë Sisters, examining the writers' upbringing and the sources of their inspiration.

In December 2012, Hancock took part in a Christmas special edition of the BBC programme Strictly Come Dancing.

In January 2016, Hancock made a guest appearance in an episode of the BBC medical drama Casualty for its 30th anniversary. From December 2016 until its conclusion in January 2019, she starred alongside Dawn French, Emilia Fox and Iain Glen in all three seasons of the Sky One comedy drama series Delicious.

In January 2017, Hancock made a guest appearance in an episode of the Inspector Morse prequel Endeavour alongside her stepdaughter Abigail Thaw.

In 2020, Hancock co-presented Great Canal Journeys for Channel 4 with Gyles Brandreth, with whom she had previously appeared on Celebrity Gogglebox. In 2021, she appeared in more Great Canal Journeys as well as the Sky One fantasy drama A Discovery of Witches as Goody Alsop, and as Eileen in ITV's Unforgotten.

Other work 
In March 1963, Hancock made a comedy single record, "My Last Cigarette". The song is about someone trying to give up smoking: however, every good intention is dependent on her having "just one more cigarette".

In 1980, she appeared in the movie The Wildcats of St Trinian's which she called "one of the worst films ever made".

Hancock regularly works in radio. She has been a semi-regular contestant on the BBC Radio 4 panel game Just a Minute since 1967. She starred as Alice Foster in the BBC Radio 2 comedy series Thank You, Mrs Fothergill, in 1978–79, alongside Pat Coombs. In 1995 Hancock provided the voice of Granny Weatherwax in BBC Radio 4's adaptation of Terry Pratchett's Discworld novel Wyrd Sisters. In 2011, Hancock appeared in the BBC Radio 4 series North by Northamptonshire, alongside Geoffrey Palmer.

She has made guest appearances on television shows like Grumpy Old Women, Room 101, Have I Got News for You and Would I Lie To You?. From March to May 2010, she appeared as a judge on the BBC show Over the Rainbow, along with Charlotte Church, Andrew Lloyd Webber and John Partridge.

From 2007 to 2012 Hancock was chancellor of the University of Portsmouth.

Hancock was the subject of This Is Your Life in 1977 when she was surprised by Eamonn Andrews at the curtain call of the play The Bed Before Yesterday at the Lyric Theatre, London.

Personal life
Hancock was married to actor Alec Ross from 1955 until his death from oesophageal cancer in 1971. They had one daughter, Melanie, born in 1964. In 1973, Hancock married actor John Thaw. He adopted Melanie and they had another daughter, Joanna Thaw. Thaw's daughter Abigail, from his first marriage, also joined their family. All three of their daughters have become actresses.

Hancock was married to Thaw until his death (also from oesophageal cancer) on 21 February 2002. Hancock herself was diagnosed with breast cancer in 1988, but made a full recovery. Her 2004 book, The Two of Us is a dual biography, which gives accounts of both their lives, as well as focusing on their 28-year marriage. This was followed by the 2008 book, Just Me, an autobiographical account of coming to terms with widowhood, and Old Rage in 2022. In 2014 she published her debut novel, Miss Carter's War. Hancock had published the memoir Ramblings of an Actress in 1987.

Hancock is a member of the Religious Society of Friends (Quakers). She is a patron of educational charity Digismart as well as a trustee of the John Thaw Foundation.

Hancock was appointed Officer of the Order of the British Empire (OBE) in the 1974 Birthday Honours, Commander of the Order of the British Empire (CBE) in the 2011 New Year Honours and Dame Commander of the Order of the British Empire (DBE) in the 2021 New Year Honours for services to drama and charity.

Hancock is a friend of Sandi Toksvig and read Maya Angelou's poem "Touched by an Angel" at the "I Do To Equal Marriage" event which celebrated the introduction of same-sex marriage in England and Wales.

Honours and awards 
1966 Tony Award nomination, Best Actress in a Play for Entertaining Mr Sloane
1974 Officer of the Order of the British Empire (OBE) for services to drama
1978 Laurence Olivier Award nomination, Best Comedy Performance as Miss Hannigan in Annie
1980 Laurence Olivier Award nomination, Best Actress in Musical for her role as Mrs Lovett in Sweeney Todd
1982 Laurence Olivier Award nomination, Best Supporting Actress for her role as Paulina in The Winter's Tale
1989 Laurence Olivier Award nomination, Best Actress for her role as Prin in Prin
2002 BAFTA nomination, Best Actress for The Russian Bride
2003 BAFTA nomination, Best Actress for Bedtime
2007 Appointment as Chancellor of the University of Portsmouth
2007 Laurence Olivier Award, Best Performance in a Supporting Role in a Musical for her role as Fraulein Schneider in Cabaret
2010 Laurence Olivier Award nomination, Best Performance in a Supporting Role in a Musical for her role as Mother Superior in Sister Act the Musical
2010 Lifetime Achievement Award at the Women in Film and Television Awards
2011 Commander of the Order of the British Empire (CBE) for services to drama
2021 Dame Commander of the Order of the British Empire (DBE) for services to Drama and to Charity

Filmography

Partial list of Television Credits

References

External links

Sheila Hancock on Who Do You Think You Are?
sheilahancock.net (website registered in Hungary)

1933 births
20th-century English actresses
21st-century English actresses
20th-century English memoirists
21st-century English memoirists
21st-century English novelists
20th-century English women writers
21st-century English women writers
Actors from the Isle of Wight
Actresses from Kent
Actresses awarded damehoods
Alumni of the Open University
Alumni of RADA
British Quakers
Dames Commander of the Order of the British Empire
English film actresses
English Quakers
English soap opera actresses
English stage actresses
English television actresses
English voice actresses
Laurence Olivier Award winners
Living people
People associated with the University of Portsmouth
People educated at Dartford Grammar School for Girls
People from Bexleyheath
WFTV Award winners